The Hofmeister series or lyotropic series is a classification of ions in order of their lyotrophic properties, which is the ability to salt out or salt in proteins. The effects of these changes were first worked out by Franz Hofmeister, who studied the effects of cations and anions on the solubility of proteins.

Hofmeister discovered a series of salts that have consistent effects on the solubility of proteins and (it was discovered later) on the stability of their secondary and tertiary structure.  Anions appear to have a larger effect than cations, and are usually ordered

(This is a partial listing; many more salts have been studied.)
The order of cations is usually given as

The mechanism of the Hofmeister series is not entirely clear, but does not seem to result from changes in general water structure, instead more specific interactions between ions and proteins and ions and the water molecules directly contacting the proteins may be more important. Recent simulation studies have shown that the variation in solvation energy between the ions and the surrounding water molecules underlies the mechanism of the Hofmeister series. More recently, a quantum chemical investigation suggests an electrostatic origin to the Hofmeister series. This work provides site-centred radial charge densities of the ions' interacting atoms (to approximate the electrostatic potential energy of interaction), and these appear to quantitatively correlate with many reported Hofmeister series for electrolyte properties, reaction rates and macromolecular stability (such as polymer solubility, and virus and enzyme activities).

Early members of the series increase solvent surface tension and decrease the solubility of nonpolar molecules ("salting out"); in effect, they strengthen the hydrophobic interaction.  By contrast, later salts in the series increase the solubility of nonpolar molecules ("salting in") and decrease the order in water; in effect, they weaken the hydrophobic effect. The salting out effect is commonly exploited in protein purification through the use of ammonium sulfate precipitation.

However, these salts also interact directly with proteins (which are charged and have strong dipole moments) and may even bind specifically (e.g., phosphate and sulfate binding to ribonuclease A). Ions that have a strong 'salting in' effect such as I− and SCN− are strong denaturants, because they salt in the peptide group, and thus interact much more strongly with the unfolded form of a protein than with its native form.  Consequently, they shift the chemical equilibrium of the unfolding reaction towards unfolded protein.

The denaturing of proteins by an aqueous solution containing many types of ions is more complicated as all the ions can act, according to their Hofmeister activity, i.e., a fractional number specifying the position of the ion in the series (given previously) in terms of its relative efficiency in denaturing a reference protein. The concept of Hofmeister ionicity Ih has been invoked by Dharma-wardana et al. where it is proposed to define Ih  as a sum over all ionic species, of the product of the ionic concentration (mole fraction) and a fractional number specifying the "Hofmeister strength" of the ion in denaturing a given reference protein. The concept of ionicity (as a measure of the Hofmeister strength) used here has to be distinguished from ionic strength as used in electrochemistry, and also from its use in the theory of solid semiconductors 

The stability of metal ion protein binding, which affects the properties of metal cofactor-containing proteins in solution, is reflected by the Irving-Williams series.

References

Further reading

 Hofmeister Still Mystifies, Chemical & Engineering News, July 16, 2012.

Solutions
Physical chemistry
Laboratory techniques